Chris Palmer is a Canadian politician, who was elected to the Nova Scotia House of Assembly in the 2021 Nova Scotia general election. He represents the riding of Kings West as a member of the Progressive Conservative Association of Nova Scotia.

He is a financial advisor and active community volunteer.

References

Year of birth missing (living people)
Living people
Progressive Conservative Association of Nova Scotia MLAs
21st-century Canadian politicians
People from Kings County, Nova Scotia